Tropodiaptomus falcatus is a species of calanoid copepod in the family Diaptomidae.

The IUCN conservation status of Tropodiaptomus falcatus is "DD", data deficient, risk undetermined. The IUCN status was reviewed in 1996.

References

Diaptomidae
Articles created by Qbugbot
Crustaceans described in 1933